Schwarze Kulmke is a small river of Lower Saxony, Germany. It flows into the Verlorene Kulmke near Herzberg am Harz.

See also
List of rivers of Lower Saxony

Rivers of Lower Saxony
Rivers of Germany